Badin is a city in Sindh, Pakistan.

Badin may also refer to:

Places 
 Badin District, a district in Sindh, Pakistan
 Badin Taluka, an administrative division of the district
Badin, North Carolina, a village in Carolina, US
 Badin Historic District
Badin Lake, a lake in the US
Badín, a village in Slovakia
Horný Badín, a village in Slovakia
Dolný Badín, a village in Slovakia

People 
 Clément Badin (born 1995), French footballer
 Georges Badin (1927–2014),  French poet and painter
 Gustav Badin (died 1822), Swedish courtservant and diarist
 Stephen Badin (1768–1853), American Catholic priest

See also
Badingham, a village in the United Kingdom
Badinabad-e Piran, a village in Iran
Badin Hall (University of Notre Dame), a hall of University of Notre Same, USA